The Living Room is an Australian lifestyle program. The show is hosted by Amanda Keller with co-presenters Barry Du Bois, Chris Brown, and Miguel Maestre.  The program began airing on Network Ten on 11 May 2012. The show is aired at 7:30 pm every Friday on Network Ten.

The show is a quadruple award-winner of the Logie Award for Most Popular Lifestyle Program in 2015, 2016, 2017 and 2018.

On 30 November 2019, the program was temporarily axed by Network Ten after 8 seasons, due to cost-cutting measures; however a Christmas special aired on 20 December 2019. On 7 March 2020, it was announced that The Living Room, now produced in-house by Network Ten Studios, had been renewed and it returned on 3 July 2020. 

In October 2022, Ten revealed that the program would take a break in 2023.

Format
The show delves into a range of lifestyle topics including renovations, travel and pet advice and cooking. From 2012 to 2019 the show featured the team presenting stories in front of a studio audience of around 60 people, with a mixture of live and pre-recorded content presented. The studio segments were filmed at Network Ten Studios in Pyrmont, a suburb in Sydney's inner-city.

The show shifted format in 2020, focussing on helping a family each episode instead of featuring several unrelated lifestyle segments. The 2020 season features a "home base" filmed in a converted warehouse in Newtown, and also axed the studio audience.

Episodes

Series Overview

Presenters

Others

Stand-in co-hosts

Chris Brown
While Chris Brown is away in Kruger National Park, South Africa, co-hosting the show I'm a Celebrity...Get Me Out of Here! with Julia Morris, his stand-in co-hosts for The Living Room during that period have been chosen from 'turn-of-the-wheel' spins by Amanda.  These stand-in co-hosts have included:

2015
 Tim Robards – TV reality star from The Bachelor Australia 
 Grant Denyer – host of Family Feud
 Brendan Jones – Amanda's radio co-host
 Shane Jacobson – Australian actor and former co-host of Top Gear
 Colin and Justin – Interior decorators and Scottish TV presenters
 Ben Mingay – Wonderland actor 
 Scott Tweedie – The Loop  co-host

2016
 Jamie Durie – TV presenter, landscaper and horticulturalist
 Kris Smith – TV personality and model who later became a contestant on I'm a Celebrity...Get Me Out of Here!

2017
 Shannan Ponton – Personal trainer for contestants on The Biggest Loser

2018
 Jamie Durie – TV presenter, landscaper and horticulturalist
 Matty Johnson – TV reality star from The Bachelor Australia
 Kris Smith – TV personality and model

2019
There were no 'stand-in co-hosts' for Chris Brown during the beginning of 2019 because The Living Room began airing later in the year because the majority of the co-hosts had other commitments. Brown was instead absent from the filming of two episodes as he was on an Antarctic expedition on Aurora Expeditions, with Greg Mortimer.

 Beau Ryan – host of The Amazing Race Australia
 Robert Irwin

2020
There were no 'stand-in co-hosts' for Brown in 2020 as the program did not commence airing until July of that year due to the majority of co-hosts having other commitments and negotiations between WTFN Entertainment and Network Ten on the show's rights.

Barry Du Bois
While Barry Du Bois was away for cancer treatment in 2018, Amanda personally looked for stand-in co-hosts for him.
 
 Grant Denyer – host of Family Feud

Awards and nominations

Logie Awards

See also

 List of Australian television series
 Better Homes and Gardens
 Bondi Vet: Coast to Coast
 The Renovators

References

External links
 
 Official Facebook Page
 

Network 10 original programming
Australian non-fiction television series
2012 Australian television series debuts
Television shows set in Sydney
English-language television shows